The 3rd Beijing College Student Film Festival was held in 1996 in Beijing, China. The Accused Uncle Shangang was the biggest winner, receiving two awards, including Best Film Award and Best Actor Award.

Awards
 Best Film Award: The Accused Uncle Shangang
 Best Director Award: Li Shaohong for Red Powder
 Best Actor Award: Li Rentang for The Accused Uncle Shangang
 Best Actress Award: None
 Best Visual Effects Award: Narrow Escape
 Committee Special Award: A Mongolian Tale
 Special Jury Award: Long Live Soldiers

References

External links

Beijing College Student Film Festival
1996 film festivals
1996 festivals in Asia
Bei